American Alpha was a professional wrestling tag team, composed of former amateur wrestlers Jason Jordan and Chad Gable. The team performed on WWE's developmental brand NXT before being moved up to the main roster on the SmackDown brand. The team was disbanded after Jordan moved to the Raw brand on July 17, 2017 while Gable stayed on SmackDown.

They were one-time NXT Tag Team Champions and one-time SmackDown Tag Team Champions. This made them the only tag team to have won tag team championships in both NXT and WWE's main roster in the same year.

History

Formation and NXT Tag Team Champions (2015–2016) 

Starting in May 2015, NXT newcomer Chad Gable began a storyline with Jason Jordan, in which he tried to convince Jordan to form a new partnership, following the dissolution of Jordan's team with Tye Dillinger. After nearly two months of coaxing, Jordan finally agreed to a tag team match with Gable as his teammate. On the July 15 episode of NXT, Jordan and Gable were successful in their official debut together against the team of Elias Samson and Steve Cutler. On September 2, Jordan and Gable competed in the first round of the Dusty Rhodes Tag Team Classic tournament, beating the team of Neville and Solomon Crowe. After defeating the Hype Bros, they would get eliminated from the tournament by the team of Baron Corbin and Rhyno. Originally a heel tag team, their fighting spirit, and resiliency against their larger opponents won them many fans and began a gradual babyface turn for the pair. On the November 18 episode of NXT, Jordan and Gable would call out main roster tag team The Ascension and defeat them. On the December 2 episode of NXT, Jordan and Gable would face another pair of former NXT Tag Team Champions The Vaudevillains and defeat them as well. At NXT TakeOver: London, Gable and Jordan were successful in a fatal-four-way tag team match which was taped for the December 23 episode of NXT. On the January 8 tapings of NXT, the team of Jordan and Gable began using the name American Alpha.

American Alpha squared off with Blake and Murphy on two separate occasions on the January 27 and February 24 episode's tapings, where they were successful both times, as well as teaming with Enzo Amore and Colin Cassady against them and Dash and Dawson on the February 17 episode, where they victoriously emerged.

American Alpha faced off with the Vaudevillains on the March 16 episode of NXT in a number one contender's match where they emerged victorious, earning them an NXT Tag Team Championship match against Dash and Dawson, now called "The Revival", at NXT TakeOver: Dallas. The pair won the NXT Tag Team Championship at the event. They defeated the Vaudevillains on the April 20 episode of NXT. On June 8 at NXT TakeOver: The End, American Alpha lost the titles back to The Revival, ending their reign at 68 days. After the match, they were assaulted by the debuting Authors of Pain (Akam and Rezar), who were managed by legendary manager, Paul Ellering.

The pair subsequently failed to win back the NXT Tag Team Championship after being defeated by the Revival in a two out of three falls match on the July 6th episode of NXT before wrestling their final match on the brand on July 20, where they were defeated by The Authors of Pain.

SmackDown Tag Team Champions (2016–2017) 
As a result of the 2016 WWE draft on July 19, the team was drafted to the SmackDown brand, being their first tag team pick overall. On the August 2 episode of SmackDown, American Alpha made their debut, defeating The Vaudevillians. The pair teamed with The Usos and The Hype Bros at SummerSlam to defeat the team of The Ascension, Breezango and The Vaudevillains.

The pair then entered an eight-tag team tournament which would determine the inaugural SmackDown Tag Team Champions, defeating Breezango in the first round to advance to the semi-finals where they faced The Usos. Despite defeating The Usos quickly on the September 6th episode of SmackDown, Gable's knee was kayfabe injured during a post-match assault when the Usos turned heel, rendering American Alpha unable to compete at Backlash and undoing their attempts to become the inaugural champions.

They returned on the September 20th episode to face the Usos in a number one contender's match to establish who would face inaugural Smackdown Tag Team Champions Heath Slater and Rhyno at No Mercy, where they were defeated due to Gable's injury, marking their first loss on the main roster. At the event, they would instead team with the Hype Bros to face the Ascension and the Vaudevillians where they were successful.

On the November 1 episode of SmackDown, American Alpha defeated The Spirit Squad to qualify for Team SmackDown for the 10–on–10 Survivor Series tag team elimination match at Survivor Series. Team SmackDown was defeated by Team Raw at the event, with American Alpha being eliminated by Luke Gallows and Karl Anderson after eliminating The Shining Stars. The duo won a tag team turmoil match on the following episode of SmackDown, giving them the right to face Bray Wyatt and Randy Orton of The Wyatt Family to establish the number one contenders for the WWE SmackDown Tag Team Championship, but were defeated following the interference of Luke Harper. At TLC, the pair teamed with The Hype Bros and Apollo Crews to defeat the Ascension, the Vaudevillians and Curt Hawkins on the kickoff show.

On the December 27th episode of SmackDown Live, they defeated Randy Orton and Luke Harper of The Wyatt Family, Heath Slater and Rhyno, and The Usos in a four corners elimination match to become the new SmackDown Tag Team Champions, celebrating with their families afterwards.

After defeating The Wyatt Family (Orton and Harper) in a rematch to retain their titles on January 10, the pair would go on to defend their titles in a tag team turmoil match at Elimination Chamber successfully against The Ascension, Usos, Vaudevillians, Breezango and Heath Slater & Rhyno, entering fourth and eliminating the Usos and Ascension, despite an attack by the Usos after their elimination, continuing their feud. American Alpha would defeat the Ascension on the following SmackDown in a rematch and then Breezango the week after, being confronted by the Usos after both matches.

On the March 21st episode of SmackDown Live, American Alpha lost the SmackDown Tag Team Championships to The Usos after suffering a non-title match loss to the pair the prior week. After making their Wrestlemania debut at WrestleMania 33 where both were unsuccessful in winning the Andre the Giant Memorial Battle Royal they failed in their championship rematch to the Usos, being attacked by Primo & Epico afterwards, who defeated them the following week. American Alpha got revenge by defeating the duo the following week in a beat the clock challenge match, although their time was beaten by Breezango. This was their last televised match as a tag team, as Jordan moved to Raw while Gable stayed on SmackDown.

Separation (2017)
On the June 20 episode of SmackDown, Chad Gable answered the United States Championship Open Challenge put forward by champion Kevin Owens where he was ultimately unsuccessful. On the July 4 episode, he faced AJ Styles to qualify for the Independence Day Battle Royal to determine the number one contender for the U.S. Championship, but was defeated by Styles. Afterwards in a WWE.com interview, Gable spoke about going solo. He said that he wants to compete against the top guys. He said that American Alpha thrives on competition and that they got to have a run with the SmackDown Tag Team Championship, but they know there are a lot of other tag teams who want that chance and they got pushed to the back of the line. He said that he and Jordan support each other 100% and that they can hang with any singles competitor and to wait until Jordan gets his chance to show what he can do in singles competition.

On the July 17 episode of Raw, Jason Jordan was moved to the Raw brand after being revealed as the (kayfabe) illegitimate son of Raw General Manager Kurt Angle. This effectively disbanded the team.

In other media
American Alpha made their video game debut in WWE 2K17 and they later appeared in WWE 2K18. Both Gable and Jordan are also present in WWE 2K19 but the American Alpha team is not present by default.

Championships and accomplishments 

 Pro Wrestling Illustrated
 PWI ranked Jordan #103 of the top 500 singles wrestlers in the PWI 500 in 2017
 PWI ranked Gable #104 of the top 500 singles wrestlers in the PWI 500 in 2017
Wrestling Observer Newsletter
Rookie of the Year (2015) – Gable
WWE
NXT Tag Team Championship (1 time)
WWE SmackDown Tag Team Championship (1 time)

References 

WWE teams and stables
WWE NXT teams and stables